This is a list of electoral results for the electoral district of Tablelands in Queensland state elections.

Members for Tablelands

Election results

Elections in the 2000s

Elections in the 1990s

Elections in the 1980s

Elections in the 1960s

Elections in the 1950s

References

Queensland state electoral results by district